Yunusemre  (former Saru) is a small belde (town) in  Eskişehir Province, Turkey. It is named after the great Turkish poet Yunus Emre (1240–1321) whose tomb is in the town.

Geography 
Yunusemre  is in  Mihalıcçık district of Eskişehir Province. The population of Yunusemre was 756 as of 2012.

History 
There was an underground settlement around Yunusemre during the Roman Empire. But the present settlement was founded after 1074 when Seljuk Turks began controlling the area. Initially there were only few houses around the tomb of Yunus Emre. But after the construction of the railroad in 1892, new quarters appeared around the station. In 1953 it was renamed as Yunusemre and in 1991 it was declared a seat of township.

Economy 
The major economic activities are irrigated farming, cattle breeding and dairying. Although there are marble quarries to the south of the town they are inactive.

References

Populated places in Eskişehir Province
Towns in Turkey
Mıhalıcçık District